The Yamaha DX1 is the top-level member of Yamaha's prolific DX series of FM synthesizers.

Background
The DX1 features two sets of the same synthesizer chipset used in the DX7, allowing either double the polyphony, split of two voices, or dual (layered) instrument voices. In addition, it contains twice the amount of voice memory as the DX7. It has an independent voice bank for each of two synth channels (engines). Each of 64 performance combinations can be assigned a single voice number, or a combination of two voice numbers - one from channel A and one from channel B.

Notable features
Case
 handmade Brazilian rosewood case

Keyboard
 73-key weighted wooden keyboard with polyphonic aftertouch

Algorithms

On the left side of the front panel, a printed algorithm chart provides an overview of the 32 selectable algorithms and their associated operator structuring.

Displays

Compared to both the DX5 and of course the DX7, accessibility and programmability are greatly enhanced by the sheer amount of displays available:

Performance section
 a comprehensive backlit LCD display (40 × 2 characters) which displays selected programs in Single, Dual or Split mode, as well as LFO setting and other voice-specific parameters

Algorithm panel
 thirteen single-character 7-segment numeric displays for indicating (by means of 1, 2, 4, 6 displays in 4 consecutive rows, from top to bottom) the selected algorithm, by providing positions and relationships of all active operators, as each one of these displays is linked to neighboring ones via individual stripe-style LEDs
 one single-character 7-segment numeric display (top) showing amount of feedback
 one double-character 7-segment numeric display (bottom) showing algorithm number (as referenced by the chart)

Oscillator panel
 two individual LEDs for indicating either (top) frequency ratio or (bottom) fixed frequency in Hz mode
 one individual LED for indicating positive or negative detune
 one single-character 7-segment numeric display (top) for detune amount
 one four-character 7-segment numeric display (bottom) for value (ratio or exact frequency) of the selected frequency mode

Envelope panel
 two individual LEDs for indicating either (left) center pitch or (right) amplitude level mode
 eight double-character 7-segment numeric displays for showing each individual envelope parameter, from top to bottom: R1, R2, R3, R4 (=rates) and L1, L2, L3, L4 (=levels)
 four 16-segment bar-style LEDs that graphically display either rates (in center pitch mode) or levels (in amplitude mode)

Keyboard scaling panel
 eight individual LEDs indicating selected curve response
 three double-character 7-segment numeric displays showing (left to right) left depth, break point, right depth values
 one single-character 7-segment numeric display for showing rate scaling

Sensitivity panel
 two single-character 7-segment displays showing (top) key velocity and (bottom) amplitude modulation
 one double-character 7-segment display showing output level
 one 16-segment bar-style LED that graphically displays the output level

Note: sections Oscillator/Envelope/Keyboard/Sensitivity show their values for the currently selected operator, while Algorithm does of course not.

Buttons
 solid push-buttons as opposed to the membrane buttons on the DX7, many of them containing individual LEDs for indicating statuses

Sales
Only 140 DX1 units were produced. It was used by artists including New Order, such as their tracks "True Faith" and "1963".

Related models
The Yamaha DX5 is a derivative of the DX1, introduced in 1985 with a list price of US$3,495. It has the same synth engine, but lacks the DX1's fully weighted keys, polyphonic aftertouch, aesthetics (rosewood case and wooden keyboard), and user interface features (parameter displays). It includes 76 keys with channel aftertouch and slightly improved MIDI features. Programming on a DX1 is still a little easier than on a DX5 because of its extensive parameter displays, but in general both are easier to program than a DX7, because they have larger displays as well as dedicated buttons for some programming tasks.

References

Further reading
 
 The development outline of Yamaha FM sound synthesizer; especially, the prototypes of GS1 (TRX-100), DX series (PAMS: Programmable Algorithm Music Synthesizer), DX1 (prototype DX1), and these tentative programming interfaces are seen.

External links

 mu:zines Electronics & Music Maker - Yamaha DX1 prototype review, October 1983
 Yamaha DX1 Worldwide Information Center DX1 and DX5 info site, including owner's club and technical specs.
 Vintage Synth Explorer Site information
 Sonic State Site user reviews
 VINTAGE TUTORIAL - Yamaha DX1 - FM sound design YouTube video by Cuckoo about the DX1 at Melbourne Electronic Sound Studio
 Yamaha DX5 page
 Yamaha black boxes: Yamaha DX1 digital programmable algorithm synthesizer

DX1
Polyphonic synthesizers
Digital synthesizers